Elisita is a 1980 Spanish dramatic film written and directed by Juan Cano Arecha.

The film is a love story between a young student (Antonio) and an older woman (Elisita). Action takes place in Madrid, Spain during the Francoist State.

Plot
The film begins in 1980's Spain during Spain's transition to democracy. An old single woman (Elisita) sits alone in ‘The Retiro’ park in central Madrid remembering her only love story during the post civil war in Spain.

Flashback takes us back to Francisco Franco's Francoist State. Elisita is an intelligent young but mature woman who lives with her rich widower and extremely Catholic mother Dona Elisa. Elisita's mother encourages her to find a husband and marry before she is too old. Antonio is a young student friend of the family who is preparing for his school exams. Too young to be her husband, Antonio is mutually attracted by her caring personality. Elisita is asked to help Antonio with his Latin and math lessons. As they spend several afternoons together they develop a close bond. Elisita knows this might be her last chance to fall in love and Antonio's first encounter with passion. As days pass, Elisita and Antonio fall in love and the inevitable happens.

Cast
Nicolas De Santis - Antonio
Encarna Paso - Elisita
Lola Gaos – Dona Elisa
Imanol Arias – Boy in park
Mari Paz Ballesteros - Amiga
Concha Gomez Conde – Antonio's mother
Guillermo Heras – Doctor
Socorro Anadon – Girl in park

Production notes
Nicolas De Santis who plays Antonio as lead actor is the son of famous Spanish actress Maria Cuadra and Italian producer Eduardo De Santis. He made his debut in this movie at 14 years of age.

External links

1980 films
Spanish drama films
Films set in Spain
1980s Spanish-language films
1980s Spanish films